Asgari may refer to:

People
 Asgari Bai, Indian singer
 Ali-Reza Asgari, Iranian general
 Jahangir Asgari, Iranian footballer
 Mahmoud Asgari and Ayaz Marhoni, Executed Iranians
 Sirous Asgari, Iranian materials scientist

Places
 Asgari, Iran

See also
 Askari, Iran (disambiguation)